Whissendine railway station was a station serving the villages of Whissendine in Rutland and Wymondham and Edmondthorpe in Leicestershire. The station itself was about one and a half miles from each, and was in Leicestershire. It opened in 1848 on the Syston and Peterborough Railway and was originally named Wymondham but by 1863 it had been renamed Whisendine (with one s).

References

Former Midland Railway stations
Disused railway stations in Leicestershire
Railway stations in Great Britain opened in 1848
Railway stations in Great Britain closed in 1955